Seagull is a Canadian company and sub-brand of Godin Guitars that produces acoustic guitars, mandolins, and ukuleles. The company was originally located in La Patrie, a small village in the Eastern Townships of Quebec, and founded in 1982 by Robert Godin and a few of his friends.

Guitar architecture 

Seagull guitars feature a headstock which places the tuning machines roughly in line with the nut to improve tuning stability.  Most models are available with either the Godin Quantum I electronics (featuring an under saddle transducer) or the Godin Quantum II electronics (with both a transducer and small microphone which can be blended together).

Seagull Guitars have also released a "compound-curve" top design on all of their lines.  This adds an arch to the top of the guitar to allow for a thinner and a more lightly braced top.  This is opposed to the typical flat top of an acoustic guitar which has problems with the sound hole sinking in.  As part of the new design, the top has a slight (7 meter radius) curve slightly above the soundhole which then levels out around the bridge of the guitar.  This provides stability while maintaining a traditional sound.
 
As Robert Godin, owner of Godin guitars, put it: “Our motivation for this project was to create a new acoustic design that would simultaneously improve sound and structural integrity. As a general rule better sound comes with more delicate construction. Conversely, stronger construction, such as thicker tops and heavier bracing, stifles the sound.”

Notable players 

 Michalis Hatzigiannis - Greek singer, plays a Seagull Performer Mini-Jumbo QI
 Peppino D'Agostino - Italian acoustic guitarist, plays a Seagull Artist Series Peppino D’Agostino CW model
 James Blunt - UK singer and songwriter, plays a Seagull S6 Original
 Emm Gryner - Canadian singer and songwriter, plays a Seagull Folk S6 Original
 Michelle Lambert - American singer and songwriter, plays a Seagull Artist Studio CW
 Kim Deal - American musician
DeAnne Carroll-North Carolina singer songwriter plays a seagull
 Tim Clark - Bridgewater,NS Canadian Singer and songwriter plays an Artist Mosaic CW HG EQ

References

External links

 
 History and List of Seagull Guitars

Guitar manufacturing companies
Companies established in 1982
Canadian brands
Canadian musical instrument makers
1982 establishments in Quebec
Musical instrument manufacturing companies of Canada
Manufacturing companies based in Montreal